Naïm Aarab (born 7 February 1988) is a Belgian professional footballer who plays for Tubize-Braine as a centre-back.

Career
Aarab progressed through the youth ranks of Tubize and Anderlecht, before joining the reserves of Eredivisie club NEC. He signed his first professional contract − a one-year deal − with the club in 2007. Aarab made his league debut in a 5–0 loss against PSV, as an 84th-minute substitute for Jonas Olsson on 25 August 2007.

Aarab decided to leave NEC after not reaching a new agreement, and in July 2008 he joined AEL in the Greek Super League. He spent the 2010–11 season on loan at Charleroi, suffering relegation from the top division but also managing to score his first professional goal – on 23 October 2010 in a 3–2 loss to Sint-Truiden.

On 23 July 2012, Aarab joined Hungarian Nemzeti Bajnokság I side Újpest on a four-year contract.

In September 2014, Aarab signed a three-year contract with Wydad. In his first season with the Moroccan club, he only made one appearance. Wydad won the league title that season. In July 2015, he joined Deinze on loan. There, he played 5 games until his loan period was terminated prematurely in January 2016. He played no more games for the remainder of the 2015–16 season. In Morocco, Aarab struggled with injuries and at his own request he returned to Belgium in 2016 for his rehabilitation and joined Deinze on a permanent contract at the end of that year, where he played 2 matches. In 2017, Aarab returned to Wydad. With the club, he won the national title twice and won the 2017 CAF Champions League and the 2018 CAF Super Cup.

In September 2019, Aarab moved to Tubize-Braine.

Honours
Wydad
 Botola: 2014–15, 2016–17, 2018–19
 CAF Champions League: 2017
 CAF Super Cup: 2018

References

External links

1988 births
Living people
Footballers from Brussels
Belgian sportspeople of Moroccan descent
Moroccan footballers
Belgian footballers
Belgium under-21 international footballers
Association football defenders
Association football midfielders
Association football utility players
A.F.C. Tubize players
R.S.C. Anderlecht players
NEC Nijmegen players
Athlitiki Enosi Larissa F.C. players
R. Charleroi S.C. players
Újpest FC players
Sint-Truidense V.V. players
Wydad AC players
K.M.S.K. Deinze players
Challenger Pro League players
Eredivisie players
Super League Greece players
Belgian Pro League players
Nemzeti Bajnokság I players
Botola players
Belgian expatriate footballers
Expatriate footballers in the Netherlands
Expatriate footballers in Greece
Expatriate footballers in Hungary
Belgian expatriate sportspeople in the Netherlands
Belgian expatriate sportspeople in Greece
Belgian expatriate sportspeople in Hungary